Memiş is a Turkish name. Notable people with the name include:

Given name
 Memiş Agha, Turkish captain

Surname
 Barış Memiş, Turkish footballer
 Furkan Ulaş Memiş, Turkish boxer

Turkish-language surnames
Turkish masculine given names